Nikolaos Printezis or Printesis (born 21 February 1941) is the former Roman Catholic Archbishop of Naxos, Andros, Tinos and Mykonos and former Apostolic Administrator of Chios.

Biography

On 19 December 1965 Printezis was ordained priest. On 29 April 1993 he was appointed archbishop of Naxos, Andros, Tinos and Mykonos and Apostolic Administrator of Chios by Pope John Paul II and on 4 July 1993 he was ordained bishop by Ioannis Perris, his predecessor. He retired on 25 January 2021.

References

References 
 Archbishop Nikólaos Printesis

Greek Roman Catholic archbishops
Living people
1941 births
People from East Attica